This is a list of metropolitan cities in the state of West Bengal, India according to their population.

List

References 

West Bengal
Metropolitan areas of India